Legion Lost is the name of two superhero titles published by DC Comics, both starring the Legion of Super-Heroes. The first series was a 12-issue comic book limited series co-written by Dan Abnett and Andy Lanning, often collectively referred to and interviewed as "DnA", penciled primarily by Oliver Coipel, with Pascal Alixe filling in for some issues, inked by Lanning and colored by Tom McCraw. The second series was created as part of DC's New 52 relaunch.

Publication history
Initially, "Legion Lost" series, together with its companion "Legion Worlds," was to serve as an entry point for the Legion franchise. In keeping with this, the series centred around a specific set of Legionnaires, with each issue being told from the perspective of another. It is the third instalment in the Abnett and Lanning Legion series, following the events of "Legion of the Damned" and "Widening Rifts," and was succeeded by "Legion Worlds" and a new series titled "The Legion." The series, which ran for 12 issues from 2000 to 2001, was later collected into a hardcover edition in 2011.

In September 2011, DC Comics launched a new monthly series (Legion Lost (vol. 2)). The series replaced "Adventure Comics" as the second Legion title published by DC Comics, as part of The New 52, and focuses on a small group of the original incarnation of Legion of the Super-Heroes (and Earth-247 Legionnaire Gates) as they are stranded in the present-day 21st Century, having failed to stop a shape-shifting terrorist from Rimbor from infecting Earth with a deadly virus. The series follows the changing rules of time travel since the events of Flashpoint, where time travel is more difficult. The title's final issue, #16, was published in January 2013.

Volume 1

Plot
Following the destruction of the Legion Outpost base by a tear in the fabric of space, Saturn Girl, Brainiac 5.1, Chameleon, Umbra, Kid Quantum, Live Wire, Apparition, and Monstress find themselves lost on the far side of the universe. They are discovered by Shikari, a half-bug/half-humanoid alien whose people are being hunted by an alien race known as "The Progeny". Later on, the group is also joined by their teammate "ERG-1" (who soon takes the name Wildfire after Shikari mistakenly calls him that), who had been sucked into the rift prior to the other Legionnaires; with Shikari and her tracking power acting as their guide, they start looking for ways home.

As they cross the galaxy, the Legion discover that the Progeny have been actively slaughtering entire species in genocide inspired by their radical belief that they are the "perfect" life form. They also encounter a mysterious super-hero known as Singularity and a creature known as the Omniphagos, a world-destroying monster imprisoned in a "hard light" pyramid. The creature's prison possesses cosmic teleportation capabilities that the Legionnaires attempt to use to return home.

Meanwhile, tensions flare up among the various Legionnaires: Umbra struggles from her previous possession at the hands of "The Blight", Monstress struggles to abide by the Legion's "no killing" rule when faced with the Progeny's atrocities, and Ultra Boy rages over being stranded millions of light years away from his other friends and family. These problems come to a head when it is revealed that Saturn Girl has been repeatedly "manipulating" the team's minds with her psychic powers. While she claims she was trying to keep the team levelheaded and calm, the revelation that Apparition was merely a psychic illusion designed to pacify Ultra Boy turn the group against Saturn Girl. Saturn Girl's actions are discovered after she forces herself into Umbra's head and unknowingly creates two psychic entities: one representing the totality of Umbra's darkest fears and one that represents Saturn Girl's own psyche run amuck. Both entities are defeated, and Saturn Girl is ultimately forgiven.

During the course of the series, two additional mysteries haunt the Legionnaires: the fate of Element Lad (who went through the rift along with his teammates but ultimately vanished after placing them in crystals designed to protect them while traveling through the rift and the identity of "The Progenitor", the supreme leader of the murderous "Progeny". In the end, the Legionnaires are captured and taken to the Progenitor, who is revealed to be an insane Element Lad. Element Lad explains that in trying to save the team as they came through the rift, he was cast back to the beginning of time, and that he has now lived for over a billion years. To (unsuccessfully) try and stay sane during those eons, Element Lad used his powers to create life forms, culminating in his believing himself "God", and his creation the Progeny his most perfect creation.

Realizing that their friend is insane, they confront him, during which he murders Monstress after she acknowledges that she is not one of his creations. A battle erupts, and the Legion eventually escape by way of a dimensional gateway Element Lad possesses—the hard light pyramid they had discovered earlier. As they escape, Element Lad merges with the Omniphagos and attack the Legion's ship. In order to stop the now-combined Element Lad/Omniphagos from killing his friends before they can escape back to their section of the universe, acting leader Live Wire abandons the ship and kills the monster by giving it a stroke. As he is consumed in the blast that kills his former friend and teammate, Live Wire watches his friends return home as the portal closes behind them.

Each issue of Legion Lost was narrated by a particular Legionnaire: #1 Shikari, #2 Monstress, #3 Kid Quantum, #4 Apparition, #5 Brainiac 5, #6 Umbra, #7 Ultra Boy, #8 Chameleon, #9 Saturn Girl, #10 Wildfire, #11 Element Lad, #12 Live Wire. This was largely done to help new fans get to know the Legionnaires better. This gimmick would be repeated with the follow-up miniseries Legion Worlds.

Aftermath
The fall-out from the events of Legion Lost would be felt in The Legion #30–33, Abnett and Lanning's final four issues on the series. Singularity would rally the entire galaxy against the remaining members of the Progeny, who would find themselves hunted by their former victims and systematically wiped out by them. The surviving members of the species would find a shocking ally through Live Wire, who ended up merging with a dying Element Lad, transforming him into a crystallized entity. Live Wire contacted the Legion, who convinced Singularity to spare the Progeny and stop the cycle of violence. Ultimately with help from the original Legion and the Earth-Prime Legion, Live Wire would have his face and body restored during the events of "Legion of Three Worlds".

Volume 2 / The New 52
The second series, as part of The New 52, depicts seven Legionnaires (Chameleon Girl, Dawnstar, Gates, Timber Wolf, Tellus, Tyroc and Wildfire) from the Post-Infinite Crisis "Retroboot" Legion trapped in the twenty-first century pursuing a villain who released a pathogen. The series was cancelled with issue #16.

Legion Lost: Run From Tomorrow 

When the team arrives in the 21st century, their technology such as the Time Bubble and Flight Rings do not work as intended. They had been chasing Alastor, who has released the Hypertaxis pathogen on Earth in the present time. Timber Wolf quickly apprehends Alastor, who had just destroyed a small town; however, as the team attempts to return to their own time, their Time Bubble malfunctions due to Alastor transforming from the pathogen. Gates attempts to teleport himself and Alastor away, but in the chaos, Chameleon Girl gets teleported with them. They are thought dead by the other Legionnaires. During a town memorial service for those killed in Alastor's attack, the Legion confront a doctor who had been exposed to the pathogen. Turned into living energy, much like Wildfire; he decides that he doesn't want to be human, and disperses himself.

Tellus telepathically searches the world for people infected by the pathogen, when they hear a news report of an attack from a marrow-sucking creature. Timber Wolf gets a scent from a victim's body, after having broken into a forensics lab, noting Durlan DNA on the body. Timber Wolf then interrupts a fight between two creatures exposed to the pathogen. One of the creatures is revealed to be an infected Chameleon Girl. While attempting to contain Chameleon Girl; Wildfire, Tyroc, and Timber Wolf are ambushed by the Black Razors. Meanwhile, Tellus and Dawnstar locate Alastor and try to reason with him. After Tyroc incapacitates the Black Razors, they go ahead to help the others with Alastor. Tellus defeats Alastor with a telepathic assault. Gates returns, although half of his body is scarred. Timber Wolf and an unconscious, transformed Chameleon Girl are confronted by Martian Manhunter, who renders Timber Wolf unconscious, letting the military agents arrest them. The others attempt to break into the military installation, to save their friends. Manhunter helps the team and heals Chameleon Girl, once he realizes they are heroes from the future. The team relocates to New York City, where Timber Wolf steals money from a drug gang.

Harvest tasks a team of Ravagers to subdue the members of the Legion, and bring them. The individual members of the team are attacked and defeated by:Rose Wilson, Psykill, Misbelief, Windstorm, Ridge, Hammerfist, and Crush.

Legion Lost: The Culling

In "The Culling", they are dropped into battle with the Teen Titans; initially they believe each other to be enemies, but they end up teaming up to escape Harvest, who uses technology from the Legion's time. The team recognizes Bart Allen, who is apparently a criminal in the future. Chameleon Girl is revealed to be an agent of Echo, a branch of the Science Police, with a secret mission in the present. Tellus is revealed to know the Hypertaxis pathogen would essentially become inert in the present time. Harvest also claims that he had manipulated the Legion into sending them back in time. After fighting with Harvest, the team finds a Time Bubble which they use to travel back to the future.

Back in the future, the Legion finds a world in ruins and learn that their fellow Legionnaires have given them up for dead. They are forced to return to the past; where a military task force led by Metamerican is waiting to apprehend them in New York City. Wildfire's containment suit is damaged, and his life force energy is dissipating. Wildfire is ambushed by Metamerican and his forces. He is rushed to a hospital after recovering from wounds, when he tells Gates about his past dealings with Echo. Metamerican next attacks and captures Tyroc and Chameleon Girl. Dawnstar and Tellus continue to track down Alastor, who know has the ability to pass his consciousness into others and control them. Tellus, controlled by Alastor, attacks the squad that had captured Tyroc and Chameleon Girl, before he passes his consciousness among various soldiers and Legionnaires in the area. After Wildfire contains and releases Alastor's life force into the sun, Metamerican realizes that the Legion is not his enemy.

In Legion Lost (vol. 2) #0 (November 2012), Timber Wolf's origin and connection to Echo is depicted.

Starting with Legion Lost (vol. 2) #13 (December 2012), the true intent and reason behind the team is told. In the 31st century, Chameleon Girl is an agent of Echo, tasked with finding a traitor in the past. Captain Nathaniel Adym tells her of various prophecies and ancient findings; Tyroc dying a millennium before he was born, Wildfire's faceplate found in the Arizona desert and Gates' disregard for authority, along with his conspiracy theories.

In the 21st century, The Legion relocates to New Orleans. Tellus feels "the death cry of billions...across the universe". The threat is revealed to be Lord Daggor, with his dragon Thraxx. Responding to a beacon, the Legion finds a member of the Science Police, Nathaniel Adym has come to the present to assign a new mission to the team. In the same moment, Wildfire crashes down from the sky and the team is attacked by Daggor, who plants a world-killer machine. Lacking firepower, Adym sends a distress signal to Echo agent Jocelyn Lure, who arrives with Superboy, Caitlin Fairchild, and Ridge. Harvest and his henchmen arrive to fight Daggor; as well as activating a hypnotic trigger on Superboy, making him go out of control. Psykill and Wildfire attack Daggor directly; where Wildfire's containment suit explodes, releasing his energy everywhere. Adym plans to use his Time Bubble to travel back an hour and set off a bomb, which would destroy half of the continent but stop Daggor's machine and save the future. His subordinates Lure and Chameleon Girl refuse to help him. Gates teleports to himself from the past, revealing how he received his scars. Together, the two Gates create a plan that would send Daggor, Thrax, and Adym's bomb into a distant sun. Harvest escapes, but not before returning Wildfire's original, undamaged suit.

Aftermath
The Legion Lost team remained stranded in the 21st century until they were called by Brainiac 5 to help a team of Legionnaires who had traveled back in time from the 31st century to battle Infinitus in the six issue "Infinitus Saga" in Justice League United written by Jeff Lemire. At the conclusion of this story line the Legion Lost members returned to the 31st century with the rest of their fellow Legionnaires.

Legion lost Run From Tomorrow

References

External links

Comics by Andy Lanning
Comics by Dan Abnett
Legion of Super-Heroes titles